Marijanci is a village and a municipality in Osijek-Baranja County, Croatia. There are 2,405 inhabitants in the municipality (2011 census), in the following settlements:
 Bočkinci, population 173
 Brezovica, population 53
 Čamagajevci, population 214
 Črnkovci, population 810
 Kunišinci, population 315
 Marijanci, population 838
 Marjanski Ivanovci, population 2

Name 
The name of the village in Croatian is plural.

References

External links

Municipalities of Croatia